Jan Štĕrba (born 1 June 1981 in Prague) is a Czech sprint canoeist who has competed since the late 2000s. He won the bronze medal in the K-4 1000 m event at the 2010 ICF Canoe Sprint World Championships in Poznań.

External links
 
 
 
  – Retrieved 21 August 2010.
 Canoe'09.ca profile

1981 births
Czech male canoeists
Olympic canoeists of the Czech Republic
Canoeists at the 2012 Summer Olympics
Canoeists at the 2016 Summer Olympics
Olympic bronze medalists for the Czech Republic
Olympic medalists in canoeing
Living people
ICF Canoe Sprint World Championships medalists in kayak
Medalists at the 2012 Summer Olympics
Medalists at the 2016 Summer Olympics
European Games competitors for the Czech Republic
Canoeists at the 2015 European Games
Canoeists from Prague